Censoring may refer to:

 Censoring (statistics)
 Censorship
 Internet censorship